The I4Give Foundation (Stylised "i4Give Foundation") is an Australian non-profit organisation which aims to increase forgiveness amongst communities. The foundation is behind the i4Give day on the 1st of February, and the i4Give week which begins on the 1st of February and ends on the 7th. It is a large adovacte towards forgiveness in Australia, largely inspired by the Maronite Catholic belief of forgiveness.

Background 
On the 1st of February 2020, three of Daniel and Leila's Abdallah's children walked with their four other relatives down Bettington Road, Oatlands, to get ice cream. However, while walking, a driver under the influence of drugs and alcohol struck the seven children, the parents' three children, and their cousin, passing away. The three other children were hospitalised, two recovering afterwards, one receiving permanent brain damage. The driver was charged with 20 offences including four counts each of manslaughter, dangerous driving occasioning death, and driving with a high-range blood alcohol reading and driving through a red light. He later had his 28-year sentence reduced to 20 years, 15 of those years without parole. Three days after the deaths, Leila Abdallah publicly forgave the driver, stating "Right now I can't hate him [...] I think in my heart to forgive him, but I want the court to be fair. It's all about fairness. I'm not going to hate him, because that's not who we are." She later confirmed her forgiveness, stating "we have forgiven him so we are able to grieve peacefully". The crash occurred at the Oatlands Golf Course perimeter,  however after fighting for a memorial to be placed 200 meters from the site of the crash, it was denied. Local Member of Parliament Geoff Lee, Prime Minister (at the time) Scott Morrison, and Oppositions Leader Chris Minns criticised the move, Lee calling it "Cold Hearted", and Morrison stating that the move was "distressing", stating that he was talking to Australian Premier Dominic Perrottet about the denial. Daniel Abdallah labeled the move "disappointing". The family later had another child named Selina, a mix of the two daughters names that died in the incident, Sienna and Angelina.

In December 2020, the i4Give foundation was founded, along with i4Give day and i4Give week, held for the first time on the 1st of February 2021. From June 2021, the "Four Angels" law was enforced in New South Wales, inspired by the death of the four children. The law gives a harsher penalty to drivers found to have a combination of illegal drugs and alcohol in their system. Leila Abdallah was named mother of the year in May 2021.  In June 2022, the Abdallah family was invited to attend the World Meeting of Families 2022 in Rome. The family became good friends with former Prime Minister Scott Morrison. After the death of Queen Elizabeth II, Australian Prime Minister Anthony Albanese invited Daniel Abdallah to her funeral in September 2022, along with 10 other Australians for "extraordinary contributions to their communities", citing his founding of the i4Give Foundation and its influence within Australian communities. 

A three year annual grant of AUD $65,000 was contributed to the i4Give Foundation by City of Parramatta.

i4Give Day 
i4Give day is a reoccurring date hosted annually on the 1st of February. The date of the accident was chosen as the date for i4Give intentionally, in order to be remember the tragedy as a day of forgiveness rather than sadness. Its aim is to spread the message of forgiveness throughout Australia.

The New South Wales Government, former Prime Minister of Australia Scott Morrison and current Prime Minister Anthony Albanese have both expressed their encouragement of the day, Morrison choosing to publicly forgiving Barnaby Joyce at an i4Give event held within The Kings School in 2022.

i4Give Events

i4Give Week 
The i4Give foundation also created a week long event named "i4Give week", which lasts from the 1st of February to the 7th of February annually, with numerous actives held throughout.

i4Give Sunday 
"i4Give Sunday" was also created, held on the Sunday within the first week of February, which encourages churches across Australia to "unite in a shared embrace of the Christ centred approach to forgiveness". The Kings School's "Kings Community Church" partnered with the foundation for a chapel service in 2022, which was live-streamed on YouTube. The service was also held in 2023, with Headmaster Tony George making a speech.

i4Give Festival 
The i4Give foundation runs a Gala Event on i4Give day every year, the first two being postponed due to covid. On the 4th of February 2023, the first free i4Give festival was held in Prince Alfred Park.The park was chosen as Leila Abdallah used to take her children to the park before the crash. Its aim was to encourage young people to start forgiving at a young age. Anthony Albanese held a speech at the event, and multiple members and former members of parliament attended, including Scott Morrison, Andrew Charlton, Dominic Perrottet, Chris Minns, and Donna Davis. Many members of the Canterbury-Bankstown Bulldogs Australian Rugby League team were also in attendance, who had previously supported the i4Give Cup in 2022. The father of the relative that died in the crash, Bob Sakr, also attended.

i4Give Cup 
The i4Give Cup is an event held by the i4Give foundation. It is a joint initiative between the Australian Rugby League team Canterbury-Bankstown Bulldogs and City of Parramatta, in order to support the family and their decision to forgive. It was launched the Tuesday 7th of June 2022 at Accor Stadium by Bulldog's captain Josh Jackson and Clint Githerson. The event was attended by the Bulldog's Chief-Executive Aaron Warburton, and former players Tim Mannah, Terry Lamb and Hazem El Masri. The match was held between the Parramatta Eels and the Bulldogs' on the 13th of June 2022, the i4Give cup presented by Daniel Abdullah to the winning team (the Bulldogs).

References

External links 
 Official website
 "The Four Angels" blog

Non-profit organisations based in Australia